Wood Valley Temple is a Tibetan Buddhist temple located five minutes above Pahala on the Big Island of Hawaii. Its Tibetan name is Nechung Dorje Drayang Ling.

History
The temple was built in 1902 as a Nichiren Buddhist temple. Originally built closer to Pahala, the temple was moved in 1925 to its current location after a major flood in 1917 damaged the temple.

In the mid-1960s, the temple was abandoned after the Ka'u Sugar company ended their operations in the area. In 1973, the temple was leased to the Nechung lineage, a Nyingma lineage of Tibetan Buddhism associated with the Nechung Oracle, in order to start a center for Buddhist study and meditation on the island.

Citations

References

Further reading
 A book about Nechung Rinpoche who founded the temple.

External links

20th-century Buddhist temples
Buddhist temples in Hawaii
Nyingma monasteries and temples
Religious buildings and structures completed in 1902
Religious buildings and structures in Hawaii County, Hawaii
Tibetan Buddhist temples